Tibetan language may refer to:
 Classical Tibetan, the classical language used also as a contemporary written standard
 Lhasa Tibetan, the most widely used spoken dialect
 Any of the other Tibetic languages

See also 
Old Tibetan, the language used from the 7th to the 11th century
Central Tibetan language, which forms the basis of Standard Tibetan
Khams Tibetan, spoken in the south-east
Amdo Tibetan, spoken in the north-east
Tibetan (disambiguation)